Orani João Tempesta  (born 23 June 1950) is a Brazilian prelate of the Catholic Church who has been archbishop of Rio de Janeiro since 2009. He was previously bishop of São José do Rio Preto from 1997 to 2004 and archbishop of Belém do Pará from 2004 to 2009.

Early years
Tempesta was born in São José do Rio Pardo in the State of São Paulo. He is the youngest son of the Italian immigrant Achille Tempesta and his Brazilian wife Maria de Oliveira.
 
After completing his elementary and lower secondary-school studies in São José do Rio Pardo, Tempesta entered the Cistercian Monastery of São Bernardo in the same city in 1967. He studied philosophy at the Monastery of São Bento (St. Benedict) in São Paulo, and theology at the Salesian Theological Institute of Pope Pius IX in São Paulo.

Tempesta made his religious profession as a monk on 2 February 1969 and was ordained a priest on 7 December 1974. He was appointed prior of the monastery in 1984, while also acting as parish priest of the Parish of São Roque, as Diocesan Coordinator of Communications and Pastoral Care, and as professor at the Coração de Maria institute in São João da Boa Vista. In September 1996, when the Monastery of São Bernardo was raised to the status of an abbey, he was elected its first abbot.

Bishop
On 26 February 1997, Tempesta was appointed Bishop of São José do Rio Preto and received episcopal consecration on 25 April of that year. In addition he was Apostolic Administrator of the territorial abbacy of Claraval from 1999 until it was united with the Diocese of Guaxupé on 11 December 2002.

On 13 October 2004 Tempesta was appointed the Archbishop of Belém do Pará, and in 2007 he was a delegate to the Fifth General Conference of the Bishops of Latin American and the Caribbean.

On 27 February 2009 Tempesta was named Archbishop of Rio de Janeiro. He took possession of the see on 19 April 2009. Tempesta received the pallium from Pope Benedict on 29 June 2009.

Cardinal
Pope Francis announced in January 2014 that he would make Tempesta a cardinal on 22 February 2014.

In September 2014 he was appointed a member of the Congregation for the Evangelization of Peoples, and later of the Congregation for Catholic Education, and the Pontifical Council for the Laity.

In 2016 Cardinal Tempesta had to shelter behind his car during a gun battle between police and armed bandits. He was on his way to the airport when shooting forced his car to stop. "When [the firing] subsided a bit, we reversed and took another street," Cardinal Tempesta told blog Sim, sou Católico. "I could see there with me, so many good people with the desire to live in peace in a more peaceful and fraternal world. Many were going to work, and suddenly needed to guard against any possible stray bullet," Cardinal Tempesta said later.

See also
Cardinals created by Francis

References

External links

 
Orani João Tempesta

|-

1949 births
Living people
People from São José do Rio Preto
Brazilian people of Italian descent
Cistercian abbots
Cistercian bishops
Members of the Congregation for the Evangelization of Peoples
Cistercian cardinals
21st-century Roman Catholic archbishops in Brazil
20th-century Roman Catholic bishops in Brazil
Brazilian cardinals
Cardinals created by Pope Francis
Members of the Congregation for Catholic Education
Members of the Pontifical Council for the Laity
Roman Catholic archbishops of Belém do Pará
Roman Catholic archbishops of São Sebastião do Rio de Janeiro
Roman Catholic bishops of São José do Rio Preto
People from São José do Rio Pardo